Bani Hadiyah is a tribal name, originating in Ras Al Khaimah, in the United Arab Emirates (UAE) and in areas of Northern Oman.

The Bani Hadiyah is one of two main sections of the Shihuh tribe. The other is the Bani Shatair. The Bani Hadiyah is also divided into sections, including the Bani Muhammad; Bani Ali; Bani Ham Mazyud and Khanazirah. Traditionally, the Shihuh changed domicile, taking work in Ras Al Khaimah, including the villages of Sha'am and Rams during the pearling season and farming in the Rus Al Jibal area of the Hajar Mountains during the winter.

The relationship between the Shihhu and the Rulers of Ras Al Khaimah was often fractious, and both Rams and Sha'am seceded several times before, in 1921, becoming part of the recognised Trucial State of Ras Al Khaimah.

References 

Tribes of the United Arab Emirates